Abū Naṣr al-Fatḥ ibn Muḥammad ibn Ubayd Allāh ibn Khāqān ibn Abdallah al-Qaysī al-Ishbīlī  (d . 1134), known as al-Fath ibn Khaqan, was a popular anthologist of al-Andalus.

Life
Born in Seville, al-Andalus (now Spain), he received an elite education and  travelled widely across al-Andalus. Described as a 'libertine' and yet he was appointed secretary to the Almoravid governor of Granada Abū Yūsuf Tāshfīn ibn ‘Alī; a post he abandoned almost immediately to travel to Morocco in the Maghreb where sometime later he was murdered in his Marrakesh hotel, it was rumoured, on the orders of the sultan.

Works

Qalā'id al-'Iqyān ‘Collars of Gold’ or 'Necklace of Rubies'; akhbar (traditions) of poets of the Maghreb and al-Andalus, who were his contemporaries with examples of their poems.
Maṭmaḥ al-anfus wa-masraḥ al-taʼannus fī mulaḥ ahl al-Andalus (Kābir, Wāsiṭ, Saghīr  Large, Medium, Small) 'The Aspiration of the Souls and the Theater of Congeniality in the Anecdotes of the People of al-Andalus'; History of the ministers, scribes and poets of al-Andalus.
These two works are written in rhymed prose full of metaphorical expressions and are an excellent source of information about the apogee of Andalusian letters.

Sources
 Ibn KhallikanWafayāt al-A’yān wa-Anbā’ Abnā’ al-Zamān (tr. Obituaries of Eminent Men} 
 Ḥāfiẓ Ibn Diyha al-KalbīAl-Mutrib fī Ash’ār Ahl il-Mughrib           
 Al-ṢafadīAl-Wāfī bi-'l-wafayāt

References

Citations

Bibliography

Further reading

External links
Literary Excerpts on Art and Architecture in Andalusia, compiled and translated by Cynthia Robinson, Institute for Advanced Study, Princeton 

1134 deaths
Year of birth unknown
12th-century historians from al-Andalus
12th-century Arabic writers
12th-century biographers
12th-century non-fiction writers
Arab biographers
People from Seville